El Pintor (Spanish for "the painter"; also an anagram of "Interpol") is the fifth studio album by the American rock band Interpol. It was released through Matador Records and Soft Limit on September 8, 2014, internationally, and on September 9, 2014, in North America. 

El Pintor received both critical and fan praise, and is often seen as an improvement over the band's previous self-titled album. The band embarked on a summer tour preceding the album's release. Five singles were released from the album: "All the Rage Back Home", "Ancient Ways", "My Desire", "Anywhere", and "Everything Is Wrong".

Production
Self-produced by the band and recorded at Electric Lady Studios and Atomic Sound in New York City, the album was engineered by James Brown (known for his work for Foo Fighters) and mixed by Alan Moulder (known for his production and mixing work for My Bloody Valentine, Swervedriver, the Smashing Pumpkins and Nine Inch Nails). The bass duties on the album were taken over by frontman Paul Banks. The album features guest appearances by Brandon Curtis (Secret Machines), Roger Joseph Manning Jr. (Jellyfish) and Rob Moose (Bon Iver).

It is the band's first album without bassist Carlos Dengler, who departed Interpol after the release of the band's eponymous album in 2010. In a 2018 interview with Vice, Banks claimed that the band's future was uncertain after Dengler left, saying: "it was really just daunting to find out if we could be a good band without Carlos, because he was a really integral member of our band." However, it didn't take long for the group to find the type of sound they wanted to go with in the future. Banks continued: "I think everyone was of common mind and purpose when we made this record. We’d gone pretty far left on Interpol, so I think there was a spirit of “Let’s just try to rock.” It was a good reset for us."

Critical reception

Reviews of El Pintor have been highly positive overall. At Metacritic, which assigns a normalized rating out of 100 to reviews from critics, the album received an average score of 77, which indicates "generally favorable reviews", based on 34 (26 positive and eight mixed) reviews. Clash magazine critic Will Salmon wrote: "...as an exercise in getting back to where you once belonged, El Pintor is highly successful". Dom Gourlay of Drowned in Sound thought that the album "feels more structured than Interpol" and stated, "Bold in intention and quiet in confidence, they've gone back to basics here and for the most part, the results are sublime". Gourlay also described the album as the band's "finest record in a decade". Writing for NME, Rhian Daly stated that the band proved that "there's still plenty of value in their elegantly downtrodden aesthetic." The Skinny critic Gary Kaill wrote: "Expansive and texturally advanced, and arguably their strongest outing since that lauded debut, this is a welcome second coming".  Uncut magazine also stated: "It's back go [sic] icy, slightly gothic basics". Larry Fitzmaurice of Pitchfork gave a more mixed review of the album, stating: "There’s nothing here that touches the band’s creative peak, but any of El Pintors songs could hang with Interpol's strongest deep cuts".

El Pintor made its way onto multiple music magazine best of the year lists, most prominently, Drowned in Sound (No. 13), Q (No. 12) and NME (No. 49). It was voted the second best album of 2014 by the popular German music website Laut.de.

Accolades

Track listing

Personnel
Interpol
Paul Banks vocals, rhythm guitar, bass guitar, production
Daniel Kessler lead guitar, piano (10), production
Sam Fogarino drums, percussion, production

Guest musicians
Brandon Curtis keyboards (1–8, 10, all bonus tracks)
Roger Joseph Manning, Jr. keyboards (9)
Rob Moose violin (10); viola (10)
Brad Truax – bass guitar on "Slow Hands (Live)" on the Target deluxe edition
Other personnel
James Brown engineering, recording
Alan Moulder mixing
Greg Calbi mastering

Charts

Weekly charts

Year-end charts

Release history

References

External links
 

2014 albums
Interpol (band) albums
Matador Records albums